Nutmeg is an online investment management company based in London. The company was founded in April 2011 and is registered in the United Kingdom as Nutmeg Saving and Investment Limited.

Nutmeg is an online discretionary investment management company (discretionary meaning that it makes all investment decisions on behalf of its customers, rather than providing a platform for people to trade on). The company invests customers’ funds in line with their investment goals and appetite for risk. It invests in listed securities, debt, cash, commodities and other investment asset classes, primarily, but not exclusively, via exchange-traded funds (ETFs).  It provides an online alternative to stockbroker platforms where customers make their own trading decisions.

Nutmeg provides investors with online access to investment management taking their inspiration from the tech world rather than the financial sector.

History 
Nutmeg was founded in 2011 by Nick Hungerford and William Todd.

In 2019, The Economist described Nutmeg as a "hit fintech startup" and as being a client of Carta, a firm that keeps track of the stakes in companies.

Martin Stead left the company in 2019, following a loss of  £18.6 million. Nutmeg has yet to make a profit.

Nutmeg managed portfolios worth £1.9 billion as of December 2019.

The company had around 80,000 customers and managed £2bn in assets as of January 2020.

The company was purchased by JP Morgan for an undisclosed sum in June 2021.

Personnel 
Key personnel within the organisation include Neil Alexander (CEO), Matt Gatrell (COO), Darragh Geraghty (Chief Risk and Compliance Officer) and James McManus (Chief Investment Officer). Board members are: William Reeve (Chairman), Johnny Chen, Roman Cheng, Craig Anderson, Stephen Clark, Neil Alexander and  Matt Gatrell.

Operations 
Nutmeg’s investment division manages customer assets.  It primarily uses Exchange-traded funds (ETFs) as their vehicle for investing customers’ funds.

References 

2011 establishments in the United Kingdom
Investment companies of the United Kingdom